Daniel Bechtel (July 31, 1840 – August 9, 1907) was an American politician and farmer.

Born in Lycoming County, Pennsylvania, Bechtel moved with his parents to Wisconsin in 1850 and settled in the town of Pleasant Springs, Dane County, Wisconsin. Bechtel went to business college in Madison, Wisconsin and moved to a farm in Blooming Grove, Wisconsin. He was also involved with the fire insurance business. He was the Blooming Grove town chairman and town clerk. In 1883, Bechtel served as Dane County sheriff and was a Democrat. He served on the Dane County Board of Supervisors. In 1907, Bechtel served in the Wisconsin State Assembly. Bechtel died at his home in Blooming Grove, Wisconsin.

Notes

1840 births
1907 deaths
People from Lycoming County, Pennsylvania
People from Pleasant Springs, Wisconsin
Businesspeople from Wisconsin
Farmers from Wisconsin
County supervisors in Wisconsin
Mayors of places in Wisconsin
Wisconsin sheriffs
People from Blooming Grove, Wisconsin
19th-century American politicians
Democratic Party members of the Wisconsin State Assembly